Susan B. Anthony Day is a commemorative holiday to celebrate the birth of Susan B. Anthony and women's suffrage in the United States. The holiday is February 15—Anthony's birthday.

History
The idea of honoring Susan B. Anthony with a holiday has only been around since 2011 when Representative Carolyn Maloney introduced the Susan B. Anthony Birthday Act, H.R.#655. Today, only the U.S. state of Florida has the holiday enacted with state offices closed.   In the state of Wisconsin, Susan B. Anthony Day is also an established state holiday, enacted into law April 15, 1976, from the 1975 Laws of Wisconsin, Chapter 307, section 20.  In West Virginia, this day is celebrated on Election Day on even years. This holiday is not celebrated at a national level. In 1985, The Seattle Times reported on a campaign to establish the holiday as one celebrated nationally. (Other holidays that are not commemorated on an official federal level in the U.S. but widely observed are St. Patrick's Day and Arbor Day.)   The U.S. state of California has also made this day a legal holiday as of 2014. In 2004, New York governor George Pataki signed legislation that made this a holiday in that state.

On February 11, 2011, Representative Carolyn Maloney of New York introduced the "Susan B. Anthony Birthday Act" (H.R. #655) to the 112th session of Congress to honor the birthday as a U.S. national holiday on the third Monday of February. The bill was not enacted and its current status is "dead".

Observances by state

Origins

Susan B. Anthony is known for her leadership in the long campaign for women's right to vote in the United States and also abroad.  She indicated her interest as early as 1852, when she attended the National Women's Rights Convention in Syracuse, New York.  She was also a vigorous opponent of slavery.  In 1863, during the American Civil War, she and Elizabeth Cady Stanton organized the Women's Loyal National League, the first national women's political organization in the U.S.
It collected nearly 400,000 signatures on petitions to abolish slavery in the largest petition drive in the nation's history up to that time.

By the end of the Civil War, according to historian Ann D. Gordon, "Susan B. Anthony occupied new social and political territory.  She was emerging on the national scene as a female leader, something new in American history, and she did so as a single woman in a culture that perceived the spinster as anomalous and unguarded ... By the 1880s, she was among the senior political figures in the United States."

After the Civil War, Anthony worked primarily for women's suffrage, the legal right of women to vote.  This right was established over the course of several decades, first in various states and localities, sometimes on a limited basis.  It was established nationally in 1920 with the passage of the Nineteenth Amendment to the United States Constitution, which had been introduced in Congress in 1878 by Senator Aaron A. Sargent, a friend of Anthony's.  The amendment was popularly known as the Susan B. Anthony Amendment in recognition of her leadership in achieving its passage.  She died in 1906, fourteen years before it became the law of the land.

See also

 Public holidays in the United States

References

External links
 Susan B. Anthony Day
 Merriam Webster definition of Susan B. Anthony Day
 Susan B. Anthony had her Day yesterday
 Celebrating Women's History
 Feb. 15th is Susan B. Anthony Day
 On this day in History - Prof. Boerner's Explorations
 President's Day Open Thread
 Wisconsin Public Schools Observance Day

Public holidays in the United States
February observances
Susan B. Anthony
State holidays in the United States
Birthdays